Uranipuram is a small village located in the Thanjavur District of Tamil Nadu, India. It has an average elevation of 23 metres above sea level.

Demographics
According to census of India 2011, the village has population of 4493. The total population constitutes 2190 males and 2303 females. The total household of Uranipuram village is 1082.

References

Villages in Thanjavur district